Samara is a 1995 Indian Kannada-language action film directed by Chi Guru Dutt with the association of P. Sheshadri. The film stars Shiva Rajkumar, Sudharani and Devaraj.

Cast 
 Shiva Rajkumar as Uday
 Sudharani as Usha
 Devaraj as Ravi
 Srinivasa Murthy as Narahari Rao
 Nandini Singh
 Rathasapthami Aravind 
 Satish 
 Shobhraj 
 Harish Rai 
 Thej Sapru as J. D. 
 Jai Jagadish
 Ajay Gundurao as Shankar 
 Ashok rao 
 Bharath kumar 
 Chi. Gurudatt 
 Bank suresh 
 Stunt Siddu 
 Malavika as Sandhya

Soundtrack 
The soundtrack of the film was composed by Kousthubha and the background score was by Sax Raja.

References 

1995 films
1990s Kannada-language films
Indian action films
1995 directorial debut films
1995 action films
Films scored by Sax Raja